Muthuvel Karunanidhi Stalin (born 1 March 1953), often referred to by his initials as MK Stalin, is an Indian Tamil politician serving as the 8th and current Chief Minister of Tamil Nadu. The son of the former Chief Minister M. Karunanidhi, Stalin has been the president of the Dravida Munnetra Kazhagam (DMK) party since 28 August 2018. He served as the 37th Mayor of Chennai from 1996 to 2002 and 1st Deputy Chief Minister of Tamil Nadu from 2009 to 2011. Stalin was placed 24th on the list of India's Most Powerful Personalities in 2022 by The Indian Express.

Early life and family 
Stalin is the third son of 2nd Chief Minister of Tamil Nadu and DMK Chief M. Karunanidhi, and was born to his wife, Dayalu Ammal. Stalin was born in Madras, now Chennai, on 1 March 1953. Karunanidhi was addressing a condolence meeting for Soviet leader Joseph Stalin, who died only four days after his child was born, and thus decided to name his son after Stalin.

Stalin studied at the Madras Christian College Higher Secondary School. He completed a pre-university course at Vivekananda College, and obtained a history degree from Presidency College, Chennai of University of Madras in 1973. Stalin was conferred an Honorary Doctorate by Anna University on August 1, 2009.

Stalin married Durga (alias Shantha) on August 20, 1975, and has two children.

His son is Udhayanidhi Stalin, an actor and politician. Udhayanidhi is married to Kiruthiga Udhayanidhi, an Indian Tamil film director.

His daughter is Senthamarai Sabareesan, an entrepreneur and educationist. She is the director of Sunshine Schools, Chennai. Senthamarai is married to Sabareesan Vedamurthy, an entrepreneur and political strategist.

Like his father, Stalin has also publicly disclosed that he is an atheist. But he also said that he is not against any religious beliefs.

Politics 
His political career began in his early teens when he started the DMK Gopalapuram Youth Wing with several friends. As a 14 year old, he campaigned for his uncle, Murasoli Maran, in the 1967 elections. In 1973, Stalin was elected to the General committee of the DMK.

He came to the limelight when he was jailed in Central Prison, Madras under the Maintenance of Internal Security Act (MISA) for protesting against the Emergency in 1976. He was beaten up in custody and a fellow DMK prisoner C. Chittibabu died of injuries and police torture while protecting him. He wrote his final year BA exams while in prison. Stalin formed the DMK youth wing. In 1982 Stalin became the youth wing secretary of DMK, a post he held for more than four decades.

Youth Wing 
In 1968, Stalin started the DMK Youth Wing in Gopalapuram in a barber shop with his friends. In 1983, he transformed the Gopalapuram Youth Wing into a Statewide phenomenon and led the frontal as a Secretary, a position he held for more than four decades. During the early stages of the Youth Wing, he travelled across Tamil Nadu with other members to mentor fellow youth of the state in key areas of active politics at the grassroots level.

Member of legislative assembly

Stalin contested the Assembly polls unsuccessfully from Thousand Lights constituency in Chennai. In 1989 Stalin contested Assembly polls from Thousand Lights constituency again, and won. The DMK government got dismissed in 1991 before completing its full five-year term. In 1991, he contested for the third time from the same Assembly constituency, but lost to K. A. Krishnaswamy of the AIADMK. Again in 1996, Stalin won the election as an MLA from the Thousand Lights constituency.

In 2003, Stalin became Deputy General Secretary of the DMK.
In 2011 Stalin changed his constituency for the first time in his political career, moving from Thousand Lights to Kolathur constituency on the outskirts of Chennai city.

Mayor of Chennai 
Stalin became the city's first directly elected mayor in 1996. He coined a pet project called Singara Chennai (Beautiful Chennai), lauded for improving Chennai's infrastructure. His efforts in improving city infrastructure earned him the title of Managara Thanthai (father of the city).

During his tenure as mayor, Stalin was well received by the people of Chennai. He modernized the garbage disposal system of the city of Chennai by giving priority to cleaning works. He implemented integrated development projects such as health, public construction and schools. He solved the congestion of the city of Chennai by building huge flyovers. During his first tenure, 9 major flyovers and 49 short bridges were built. He also improved the standard of Corporation Schools to be on par with private schools. In addition, parks and fountains were set up at 18 major junctions. 81 parks were cleaned and properly maintained. Saplings were planted at the Chennai Marina, the second largest beach in the world. The slaughterhouse at Perambur have been modernized to avoid polluting the environment. During his tenure, it was decided to build flyovers on 10 congested roads before the end of his term. ₹95 crores have been allocated for the construction of flyovers. However, 30% of the funds were left over when the flyovers were opened according to him. He was re-elected Mayor for the 2nd time in 2001.

However, the then Chief Minister J. Jayalalithaa enacted the Tamil Nadu Municipal Laws (Amendment) Act, in 2002, which prevents a person from holding two elected posts in the government. This law was applied retroactively to Stalin's case (he was an elected Thousand Lights  MLA) in a move widely seen as aimed at removing him as Chennai's mayor. However, the Madras High Court struck down the law stating that legislative bodies were not "prevented" from making laws affecting the "substantive rights" of persons retrospectively. However, the court held that under Madras (now Chennai) City Municipal Corporation Act, 1919, a person cannot be mayor for two consecutive terms, though unlike Stalin, earlier mayors were not directly elected. MK Stalin did not appeal in the Supreme Court.

Minister 
In the 2006 Assembly Elections, the DMK regained control of the state assembly, partly due to Stalin's efforts. Stalin became the Minister for Rural Development and Local Administration in the Government of Tamil Nadu and retained this office throughout his term. During his tenure, he developed his skills as an administrator, he was instrumental in the extensive spread of Women Self-Help Groups across the State by establishing 1,75,493 Women SHGs. He also established various comprehensive drinking water projects such as Hogenakkal and Ramanathapuram water schemes. In 2008, he became treasurer of DMK.

Deputy Chief Minister of Tamil Nadu 
On 29 May 2009, Stalin was nominated as Deputy Chief Minister of Tamil Nadu by Governor Surjit Singh Barnala.He was first dy. Chief Minister of Tamil Nadu.

Opposition leader 
During the 2016 Assembly election, Stalin went on a statewide tour titled Namakku Naame to appeal to the youth. Stalin won the Kolathur constituency and was appointed as the opposition leader. In 2017, Stalin went on another Namakku Naame tour. In 2018, his father Karunanidhi died, leaving Stalin the president of the DMK.

Secular Progressive Alliance (2019 general election - present)  
Stalin formed the Secular Progressive Alliance in Tamil Nadu and led the alliance in 2019 general election in the state. The Secular Progressive Alliance won 39 out of 40 Parliament seats, and 12 out of 21 in the Assembly by-election, with 52% of the vote. It was his first victory since taking charge as DMK President.

Ondrinaivom Vaa 
The COVID-19 pandemic and the consequences of the lockdown inflicted immense misery and suffering on people of Tamil Nadu in 2020. Stalin and members from the DMK party undertook relief measures across Tamil Nadu from Day 1 to help those in need of basic essentials.

Owing to the scale of the suffering in the State, Stalin called upon his cadres and ministers to come together as one, and Ondrinaivom Vaa was born out of this vision. The campaign was officially launched in 20 April 2020 where he set up a helpline as a single point of contact for anyone in need in Tamil Nadu.

The Helpline received over 18 lakh calls in 40 days, and the cadres, ministers efficiently tended to the requests to ensure timely delivery of services. Stalin through ‘Ondrinaivom Vaa’ also launched the campaign ‘Feed the Poor’ where NGO partners in collaboration with the Kitchen partners served over 28 Lakh cooked meals.

Chief Minister of Tamil Nadu 

In the 2021 Assembly elections, Stalin led the campaign for the Secular Progressive Alliance. They won 159 seats out of 234, with the DMK itself winning an absolute majority with 132 seats. Stalin took his oath as chief minister on 7 May 2021 along with the rest of his cabinet.

Having taken oath amid the second wave of the pandemic, Stalin started a war room to monitor the status of beds, ambulances, and oxygen supply. He attended an SOS call of a lady, spoke with her for 30 minutes, and arranged for her a bed at a hospital. He wore a PPE suit and visited the COVID-19 patients at their wards "against advice" in Government ESI Medical College Hospital. A new economic advisory council was set up with leading economists, including Esther Duflo, Raghuram Rajan, Jean Drèze, Arvind Subramanian, and former Finance Secretary S Narayan. Tamil Nadu was branded as a state with highest novel coronavirus vaccine wastage in the previous government but the Stalin government made the state to top in the list of states with lowest COVID-19 wastage policy.

Stalin handed over appointment orders of the HR & CE Department to trained aspirants of all castes as temple priests in August 2021. Stalin quoted the reformist leader Periyar in an official release which said Periyar fought for equal rights in worship for all those who believe in God. In August 2021, Stalin ranked first among all Chief ministers of India with 42% in favour, in the "Mood of the Nation" survey done by the India Today magazine. Stalin changed the name of Sri Lankan Tamil refugee camps to called ‘rehabilitation camps' and said "They are not orphans, we are there for them".
In September 2021, he announced that Periyar's birth anniversary will be celebrated as Social Justice Day every year.

In June 2021, Stalin announced that the state law ministry will review the legal cases filed by the previous government. In September 2021, Stalin's government withdrew over 5570 legal cases filed by the previous AIADMK government from the past 10 years against the journalists and the protestors seeking the repeal of the three farm laws promulgated by the Union government, Citizenship Amendment Act, methane extraction, neutrino project, Kudankulam Nuclear Power Plant and the Chennai-Salem Expressway project.

In May 2022, Stalin hailed the release of Perarivalan, convicted in the assassination of Rajiv Gandhi, and hugged him on his visit of gratitude at the Chennai Airport.

Committee assignments of 16th Tamil Nadu Assembly
Member (2021–23) Business Advisory Committee
Member (2021–23) Committee on Rules

Ungal Thoguthiyil Mudhalamaichar 
One of the key achievements of Stalin as the Chief Minister is the ‘Ungal Thoguthiyil Mudhalamaichar’  (Chief Minister in your Constituency), which is a robust grievance redressal service set up to resolve petitions and problems raised by the constituents. The timely redressal system took the state by storm as over 2.30 lakh out of 4.57 lakh grievances had been addressed by Stalin in his first 100 days of taking office.

The department originated from a programme ‘Ungal Thoguthiyil Stalin’, which was initiated by DMK President Stalin during his election campaign. Stalin had collected grievances from the citizens and assured them that their issues would be addressed in 100 days once he took office. Experts and journalists like Govi Lenin, called the scheme a direct reflection of DMK’s core principle, ‘Makkalidam Sel’ (Go to the People) coined by the party’s founding member Late. C.N Annadurai.

Makkalai Thedi Maruthuvam 
Stalin launched ‘Makkalai Thedi Maruthuvam Scheme’ on 5 August 2021, to provide essential healthcare services at the doorstep of the people in Tamil Nadu. Since launch the scheme has transformed the mode of preliminary healthcare delivery and rung in an era where essential medical services are well within the access of the poor, by delivery at their own homes.

The scheme has undertaken screening for those above 45 years of age and others with infirmities through routine door-to-door check-ups and detect non-communicable diseases that are also seen to cause sudden mortalities and impact the quality of life. The scheme will hinge on women public health workers, women health volunteers (WHVs), physiotherapists and nurses, who will provide healthcare at the doorstep.

Through the scheme, high blood pressure and diabetes, both of which go largely undetected in the villages has been screened and monthly medicines are provided at the door-step. Similarly, physiotherapy is also given to those that are in need of care. The scheme has included screening of kidney ailments and congenital defects in children and will be followed up through hospital treatment. Stalin assured that in due course, dialysis will also be provided to those with kidney ailments through portable dialysis machines. As part of the program, a 108 ambulance for exclusive emergency response in remote tribal terrains have also been established.

Tamil Nadu’s First Agriculture budget 
Stalin released Tamil Nadu’s first ever agricultural budget on 14 August 2021, which was dedicated to farmers protesting against the farm laws passed by the Union Government. The one of a kind budget was prepared after consulting farmers from 18 districts of the state and it predominantly aimed at increasing the cultivable land from the existing 60 percent to 75 percent. At present, about 10 lakh hectare land is under cultivation and the agriculture budget promises to increase it to 11.75 lakh hectare.

Under the budget, the newly launched ‘Kalaignarin Anaithu Grama Orunginaindha Velan Valarchi Thittam’, has been introduced to convert wasteland into cultivable land.

Key Highlights of the Agriculture Budget  

 The government will distribute 76 lakh Palm seeds and one lakh saplings in 30 districts during the current year 2021. The Palm tree which is the state’s tree will be protected in all regards, and that it is mandatory to seek the district collector’s permission before felling any palm tree.
 Distribution of Palm jaggery will be carried out through the public distribution system.
 A traditional paddy varieties conservation mission will be set up in memory of Nel Jayaraman, a farmer who preserved numerous traditional rice varieties.
 A separate organic farming wing will be set up under the agriculture department. Farmers who adopt organic methods of cultivation will be given input subsidies.
 The government has launched ‘Millet Mission’ with special focus on low rainfall districts such as Cuddalore, Villupuram, Kallakuruchi, Vellore and Tirupathur.
 Cooperative societies will procure minor millet rice and distribute it through a public distribution system in cities like Chennai and Coimbatore.
 Government to pay Rs 42.50 per tonne to the sugarcane farmers as an incentive during the current crushing season. A budget of Rs 40 crore has been allocated to implement the scheme.
 The Chief Minister’s Solar Powered Pump set Scheme has been introduced for farmers to install a total of 5,000 solar pump sets of 10 horse power capacity with 70 per cent subsidy. An allocation of Rs 114.68 crore has been made for the purpose.
 In addition, 1,000 farmers who own less than three acres of land will get a subsidy assistance of Rs 10,000 for purchasing new motor pump sets or replacing the old inefficient ones. A budget of Rs 1 crore has been allocated.

Illam Thedi Kalvi 
Stalin launched the ‘Illam Thedi Kalvi’ scheme on 19 October 2021, notably India’s largest volunteer-based education program”, where over 3.3 million students across 92,000 habitations are being taught by 200,000 women volunteers for 90 minutes every day.

Domain experts and Data scientists have praised the ingenuity of the scheme stating that over 24% of the total recovery from learning loss can be attributed to the ‘Illam Thedi Kalvi’ sessions and that the recovery has been a lot more progressive among the disadvantaged group.

Innuyir Kappom - Nammai Kakkum 48 
Stalin launched ‘Innuyir Kappom-Nammai Kakkum 48’ on 18 November 2021 through which the State government will bear the expenses of emergency care for accident victims for the first 48 hours. Rolling out the scheme at Stalin said that the government was paying special attention to reducing road accidents, preventing fatalities and improving road safety. The scheme is aimed at reducing deaths due to road accidents. A total of 609 hospitals including 201 government hospitals and 408 private hospitals are linked to the scheme. All persons injured in road accidents whether they are covered or not under the Chief Minister’s Comprehensive Health Insurance Scheme (CMCHIS), or even those who belong to other States or countries that occur in Tamil Nadu limits would receive treatment for the first 48 hours free of charge. As many as 81 treatment packages have been identified for accident victims in the hospitals where they shall be were admitted for the first 48 hours with a ceiling of ₹1 lakh per individual. One of the key highlights of the scheme is that the government would bear the emergency treatment expenses for the first 48 hours in private hospitals, as majority of the lives could be saved if treated appropriately within 48 hours.

Chief Minister's Dashboard 
Stalin launched the ‘CM Dashboard Monitoring System’ at his office. On 23 December 2021 which will enable him to track all welfare schemes, including the status of their implementation, fund allocation and the number of beneficiaries. The dashboard is set to help in proper monitoring, more efficiency, elimination of delays and prompt decision making. It will also update the Chief Minister on the water storage level in key dams, rainfall patterns, daily report on crimes, progress of housing schemes, employment trends, civil supplies in the State. The dashboard will display the status of pleas and representations made on the Chief Minister Helpline and under the ‘CM In Your Constituency’ scheme.

Naan Mudhalvan 
Stalin launched the ‘Naan Mudhalvan’ scheme, on 1 March 2022, which aims to equip about 10 lakh youth across the State annually with skills that will help them realise their talents for the benefit of the country. He also launched a new portal for this scheme. The scheme aims to identify, train and offer career and academic guidance to talented students in government-run and State-aided educational institutions. It also aims to offer spoken English lessons to enable students to face interview panels successfully. The scheme will offer training capsules in coding and robotics to keep pace with technological advancements. Psychological counsellors and medical doctors will offer guidance on nutrition, physical fitness and overall development of the student’s personality.

Green Tamil Nadu Mission 
Stalin launched the Green Tamil Nadu Mission  on 24 September 2022, that aims at increasing the green cover in the state from 23.7% to 33% in the next ten years. The mission will facilitate tree planting initiatives, online seedlings purchase via the Green Tamil Nadu Mission portal.

Pudhumai Penn 
Stalin launched the Moovalur Ramamirtham Ammaiyar Higher Education Assurance scheme titled 'Pudhumai Penn' at a function in Chennai on 5 September 2022, in the presence of Delhi Chief Minister Arvind Kejriwal. The scheme was transformed from Moovalur Ramamirtham Ammaiyar Memorial Marriage Assistance Scheme to the Moovalur Ramamirtham Ammaiyar Higher Education Assurance Scheme after recognising that in higher education, the enrolment ratio of girls from government schools was quite low. During the event Kejriwal unveiled 26 schools of excellence and 15 model schools set up by the Tamil Nadu government. Under Pudhumai Penn scheme, girl students, who studied from Class V to Class XII in state government schools would be paid a monthly assistance of ₹1,000 till they complete their graduation or diploma. Through the scheme, about six lakh girls would be benefited every year. The State government allocated ₹698 crore in the 2022-23 Budget for the scheme.

Stalin also announced that 25 schools run by Municipal Corporations would be elevated as Schools of Excellence in the first phase at a cost of ₹171 crore. The classrooms in these Schools of Excellence would be modernised and art, literature, music, dance, sports among others would be promoted among students.

Chief Minister’s Breakfast Scheme 
Stalin launched the ‘Chief Minister’s Breakfast Scheme’ on 15 September 2022 to prevent hunger and nutritional deficiency in children. The scheme is set to improve the nutritional status of students, eliminate deficiencies such as malnutrition and anemia, and encourage children in poor households to attend schools.

The cause of concern for Anemia among children as a major health problem in Tamil Nadu was highlighted in the National Family Health Survey-5 (NFHS) (2019–21) report. Stalin’s Breakfast Scheme is set to minimise, if not eliminate, this inadequacy. The breakfast scheme will be implemented at a cost of ₹33.56crore in more than 1,500 government-run schools across the state where over 1.14lakh primary government school children will benefit from it. It is Stalin’s hope that the education-nutrition matrix will be an inspiring model for other states.

Governing Council on Climate Change 
Stalin set up a 22-member Tamil Nadu Governing Council on Climate Change (GCCC) on 23 October 2022. Montek Singh Ahluwalia, economist; Nandan M Nilekani, co-founder and chairman of Infosys Board; Erik Solheim, Sixth Executive Director of United Nations Environment Programme; Dr Ramesh Ramachandran, founder-director of National Centre for Sustainable Coastal Management; G Sundarrajan, co-ordinator of Poovulagin Nanbargal) and Nirmala Raja, Chairperson, Ramco Community Services are among the members.

The GCCC council has been formed to provide a policy directive to the Tamil Nadu Climate Change Mission, advise on climate adaptation and mitigation activities, provide guidance to the Tamil Nadu State Action Plan on climate change and guide the implementation strategy on climate action.

The terms of reference of the GCCC includes providing guidance to the Climate Change Mission and long-term climate-resilient development pathways, strategies and action plan which will help improve livelihoods, social and economic well-being and responsible environmental management.

The council will periodically monitor outcomes and deliverables based on the strategies being followed. Besides, it will give a continued and sustained push for research, collaboration, and interdisciplinary work, in close coordination with researchers and policymakers.

The council will evaluate the efficacy of existing policies on climate change and learn from sustainable practices across the country and the world for suitable adaptation. The State Environment, Climate Change and Forest Department Secretary Supriya Sahu will be the convenor of the council.

It is imperative to note that, Tamil Nadu has been spearheading several path-breaking initiatives in the field of climate change and has set up three key missions viz., Tamil Nadu Green Mission, Tamil Nadu Climate Change Mission and the Tamil Nadu Wetlands Mission.

Egalitarianism and Social Justice in Tamil Nadu 
Stalin initiated the process to appoint persons of all castes (contrary to the hereditary Brahmin priests) as archakas (priests) for the temples in the State on 15 August 2021, and assured steps will be taken to appoint those trained by the government during the previous DMK government.

Stalin maintained that the move will fulfill the dream of former Chief Minister M Karunanidhi, and Periyar who wanted people of all castes to become temple priests. As a move seen as controversial by many, this policy however garnered him acclaim for it being the right step at a social revolution and combating discrimination at all levels.

Public Image and Reception 
Stalin’s career in the political arena has seen its ups and downs. From a challenger to an emerging pragmatic leader, the people of Tamil Nadu have credited his administrative skills and firm rejection of sycophancy. A classic example of this is when M.K Stalin asked the Education Minister, Anbil Mahesh Poyyamozhil not to print his photographs on 65 lakh bags meant for distribution among schoolchildren in the state, opting to retain pictures of his political adversaries from the previous government that had sanctioned the project.

Stalin was commended by domain experts and other ministers across the country for  not using public money to enhance his popularity among the “masses”.

On September 2, 2021 the Actor turned former Union Minister K. Chiranjeevi met with Stalin to commend him on governance efficacy and said he proved his mettle in handling the grave situation of Covid-19 pandemic. The Media houses in Kerala lauded Stalin on his policies and efforts in controlling the spread of Coronavirus during the second wave, provision of free bus pass for women and Rs 4,000 as a pandemic relief for ration card holders.

The Shiv Sena Parliamentarian Sanjay Raut, in his weekly column Rokthok in party mouthpiece Saamana praised Stalin’s governance style and criticized the Centre’s move to omit Jawaharlal Nehru and  Maulana Abul Kalam Azad’s picture from ICHR’s Independence day poster ‘Azadi Ke Amrit Mahotsav.’ Raut said the central government is practising the politics of revenge and should learn a lesson from Tamil Nadu Chief Minister Stalin, who allowed the distribution of 6.5 million school bags carrying photos of political rivals former chief ministers J Jayalalitha and E Palaniswami of the AIADMK, to ensure public money is not being spent on political vendetta.

Karnataka Chief Minister, Basavaraj Bommai commended Stalin's nuanced policies and continual effort in controlling the spread of covid-19 at the peak of the second wave.

Awards and Accolades 

Anna University conferred an honorary doctorate for Stalin for his contributions to governance and community development.
 The Kentucky Colonel Award, the highest award given by the Commonwealth of Kentucky in the United States, was given to Stalin for his public service.
 Stalin was also honored as Kentucky's Goodwill Ambassador. It is imperative to note that the honor was formerly bestowed to notable personalities such as, Former US Presidents Bill Clinton, George W. Bush and Ronald Reagan, Nobel laureate Winston Churchill and world-famous boxer Mohammed Ali.
 The Government of Tamil Nadu on 23-2-2011 received the Special Award for Best State among the Largest States in India and the Diamond State Award for Best State in 3 categories namely Civil Safety, Drinking Water and Sanitation and Women's Development.
 In the year 2006-2007, the Panchayat Department of Tamil Nadu won one of the top five places in India and won a cash prize of Rs. 86 lakh.
 The Tamil Nadu Rural Development Department received the first prize of Rs. 1 crore cash from the Ministry of Panchayat Raj of the Central Government in the year 2007-2008.
 The Tamil Nadu Municipal Department was awarded the International Certificate of ISO-9000 for the year 2008 for outstanding management skills.
 The Supreme Court commended the Government of Tamil Nadu for its excellent implementation of the Mahatma Gandhi National Employment Guarantee Scheme and said that other states should follow Tamil Nadu's example.
 Cuddalore, Sivagangai, Dindigul, Nagapattinam and Villupuram Districts were recognised by the Union Government for their outstanding implementation of the National Rural Employment Guarantee Scheme in the years 2007 -2008, 2009 – 2010 respectively.
 Tamil Nadu won the most number of Nirmal Gram Awards for its exceptional role in maintaining sanitation in the villages in the state. This prestigious award was received during Stalin's tenure as Minister of Rural and Local Administrator.

Electoral performance

Filmography 
Actor

Ore Raththam (1987)
Makkal Aanayittal  (1988)
Kurinji Malar- TV Series (late 1988?)
Suriya — TV Series

Producer
 Nambikkai Natchathram (1978)

See also 
 M. K. Stalin ministry

Notes

References

External links 

Tamil Nadu Assembly Profile

1953 births
20th-century Indian male actors
Actors in Tamil cinema
Chief ministers from Dravida Munnetra Kazhagam
Chief Ministers of Tamil Nadu
Deputy Chief Ministers of Tamil Nadu
Dravida Munnetra Kazhagam politicians
Indian actor-politicians
Indian atheists
Indian politicians
Indian Tamil politicians
Indians imprisoned during the Emergency (India)
Karunanidhi family
Leaders of the Opposition in Tamil Nadu
Living people
Mayors of Chennai
Tamil Nadu MLAs 1989–1991
Tamil Nadu MLAs 1996–2001
Tamil Nadu MLAs 2001–2006
Tamil Nadu MLAs 2006–2011
Tamil Nadu MLAs 2011–2016
Tamil Nadu MLAs 2016–2021
Tamil Nadu MLAs 2021–2026
Politicians from Chennai
Presidency College, Chennai alumni
Tamil Nadu politicians
University of Madras alumni
Indian Tamil people
People of the Sri Lankan Civil War
Indian Peace Keeping Force